A prolific and deadly winter tornado outbreak struck areas across the Southeast United States between January 21–23, 2017. Lasting just under two days, the outbreak produced a total of 81 tornadoes, cementing its status as the second-largest January tornado outbreak and the third-largest winter tornado outbreak since 1950. Furthermore, it was the largest outbreak on record in Georgia with 42 tornadoes confirmed in the state. The most significant tornadoes were three EF3 tornadoes that heavily damaged or destroyed portions of Hattiesburg, Mississippi, and Albany and Adel, Georgia. A total of 20 people were killed by tornadoes—mainly during the pre-dawn hours of the outbreak—making it the second-deadliest outbreak in January since 1950, behind the 1969 Hazlehurst, Mississippi tornado outbreak that killed 32 people. In addition, the tornado death toll was higher then the entire previous year. In the aftermath of the outbreak, relief organizations assisted in clean-up and aid distribution. Total economic losses from the event reached at least $1.3 billion (2017 USD).

Non-tornadic impacts were also felt along the East Coast of the United States. Straight-line winds in Lake City, Florida killed one person when a tree fell on their home. The extratropical cyclone morphed into a nor’easter as it moved across the Northeast United States and Canada, producing a combination of rain and wintry precipitation, as well as strong winds. One death occurred in northern Philadelphia, Pennsylvania after flying debris struck an elderly man. Thousands of residents were left without power, and significant beach erosion was observed along the New Jersey coastline.

Meteorological synopsis

On January 17, 2017, the Storm Prediction Center (SPC) noted the potential for a high-end severe weather event to occur in the Southern United States on January 21 and 22. On January 20, a large-scale, negatively tilted (aligned northwest to southeast) trough moved from the Western United States over the Great Plains, Broad cyclonic flow soon became established over much of the United States, with multiple shortwave troughs embedded within. Persistent convection from the Texas coastline to Mississippi initially inhibited the northward flow of warm, moist air and by extension limited proliferation of severe thunderstorms. Later in the day, a warm front—separating moisture-rich Gulf air and modified continental-polar air—developed over the southern Mississippi Valley within an environment of steep lapse rates and modest wind shear; this became the focal point for potentially tornadic storms. A low-level jet subsequently developed along the coast of Texas and Louisiana that evening, and thunderstorm clusters blossomed along the frontal boundary. At 7:20 p.m. CST (01:20 UTC, January 21), a tornado watch was issued for extreme eastern Texas and southwestern Louisiana, supplemented by another watch extending into southern Mississippi by 11:00 p.m. CST (05:00 UTC, January 21).

In the pre-dawn hours of January 21, a mesoscale low consolidated near Baton Rouge, Louisiana, at the western edge of the previously established warm front. This led to enhanced low-level southerly flow over Mississippi and an increased risk of supercells embedded within the broader thunderstorm complex. One of the embedded cells produced an EF3 tornado around 3:35 a.m. CST (09:35 UTC) that traveled through Lamar and Forrest counties in Mississippi. After sunrise, severe storms and tornadoes continued further to the east, and the Storm Prediction Center later issued a moderate risk for parts of Arkansas, Louisiana, and Mississippi, along with an enhanced risk for parts of Alabama, Georgia, South Carolina, and Florida. This included a 10% risk area for tornadoes, and numerous tornadoes touched down across the threat area, several of which were strong and caused significant damage. During the early morning hours of January 22, a deadly EF3 tornado produced devastating damage and obliterated a mobile home park near Adel, Georgia, killing 11 people along its path. Numerous other people were injured in the state because of the storms.

After sunrise, the Storm Prediction Center issued a high risk for a major severe weather and tornado outbreak across central Florida and southeastern Georgia, including a 30% risk area for tornadoes. Strong, long-track tornadoes were expected in the threat area, and it was the first time a high risk was issued since June 3, 2014. In Florida and Georgia, a Particularly Dangerous Situation tornado watch was issued. Meteorologists at the Jacksonville, Florida branch of the National Weather Service stated that the event "had the potential to be one of the most severe weather outbreaks since the 1993 super storm" for northeastern Florida and southeastern Georgia. Later that day, a massive EF3 wedge tornado caused severe damage in and around Albany, Georgia, killing five people and destroying many homes and businesses. A few weak tornadoes occurred in Florida during the early morning hours of January 23 before the outbreak came to an end.

Confirmed tornadoes

With 81 tornadoes touching down, the outbreak ranks as the second-largest January outbreak since records began in 1950, second only to the January 21–23, 1999, tornado outbreak (during which 129 tornadoes touched down). It also ranks as the fourth-largest winter outbreak, just behind the 2008 Super Tuesday outbreak which produced 86 tornadoes, as well as behind the December 2021 Midwest derecho and tornado outbreak. More than half of the tornadoes occurred in Georgia. With 42 confirmed in the state, the outbreak ranks as the largest on record for Georgia, surpassing the previous highest of 25 during the Hurricane Ivan tornado outbreak in 2004. Of the 42 tornadoes, 27 touched down within the county warning area of the Atlanta National Weather Service Office, the most for a two-day period. This surpassed the previous highest of 16 during the Hurricane Katrina tornado outbreak in 2005. Additionally, it shattered the record for January tornadoes in the state, bringing the monthly total to 52; the previous monthly record was just 15 in 1972. Furthermore, the 20 fatalities ranks the outbreak as the deadliest in January since 1969.

January 21 event

January 22 event

January 23 event

Hattiesburg – Petal, Mississippi

Early in the morning on January 21, a large tornado touched down northwest of Purvis in Lamar County, Mississippi, at 3:35 a.m. EST (08:35 UTC). The tornado initially caused EF1 damage, snapping and uprooting many trees and destroying small sheds. A house sustained minor roof damage and collapse of its carport, and a power pole was snapped as well. Further to the northeast, the tornado reached EF2 intensity as it ripped the roof off of a well-built brick home and destroyed outbuildings. As the tornado approached the Forrest County line, EF2 damage continued as another home had its roof torn off, a mobile home was completely destroyed, and a billboard pole was snapped. Other homes in this area sustained minor roof damage, and trees and power poles were downed. The tornado intensified to EF3 strength shortly after it crossed the Forrest County line and entered residential areas of southwestern Hattiesburg, where multiple well-constructed brick homes had roofs torn off and exterior walls collapsed, and an elderly woman was killed. The tornado continued producing EF3 damage as it crossed Veterans Memorial Drive, snapping metal power pylons and severely damaging two buildings at Living Word Church. Maintaining its strength, the tornado moved across US 49 and through a residential area, damaging several homes and destroying the top floor of a church. The tornado then tore directly through the William Carey University campus, resulting in severe structural damage and tossing and damaging numerous vehicles in the parking lots. Multiple large, multi-story brick buildings had windows blown out, roofs ripped off, and top floor exterior walls collapsed. Light poles were downed at the ball field as well.

Past William Carey University, the tornado weakened to EF2 strength as it moved through residential areas and a mobile home park to the southeast of downtown Hattiesburg. Many large trees were downed, some of which landed on and completely crushed sections of frame homes and mobile homes, resulting in three fatalities in this area. Several other frame homes had roofs and walls ripped off, a fire station was damaged, and a church lost large sections of its roof as well. The tornado then entered Petal, destroying large commercial sheds, damaging roofs and collapsing cinder block walls at several businesses, snapping many trees and power poles, and tearing large sections of roofing from homes. As the tornado impacted the eastern part of Petal, it restrengthened to EF3 intensity as multiple well-built frame homes were destroyed, some of which only had a few walls left standing. Other homes, a church, and a strip mall in this area were heavily damaged at EF2 strength as well. The tornado maintained EF3 strength as it continued to the northeast outside of Petal, toppling two metal truss towers to the ground. A brick frame home in this area was completely leveled after a nearby mobile home was thrown into it. Beyond this point, the tornado weakened back to EF2 strength as it approached the Perry County line, snapping and uprooting numerous large trees. After crossing into Perry County, the tornado damaged or destroyed several outbuildings and mobile homes, snapped and uprooted numerous trees, ripped the roof off of a frame home, and caused minor damage to several other homes near Runnelstown before dissipating. Damage intensity along this final portion of the path ranged from EF1 to EF2.

Hattiesburg and Petal had previously sustained major damage from an EF4 tornado that struck on February 10, 2013. However, damage from the 2017 tornado was more severe in Petal. Following the tornado, members of the Jackson Salvation Army were sent to Hattiesburg to provide assistance. Volunteers traveled from across the nation to assist with cleanup efforts, some of whom also provided assistance after the 2013 tornado.

Barney–Adel–Nashville, Georgia

Around 3:29 a.m. EST (08:29 UTC) on January 22, what was to become a deadly and destructive tornado first touched down along SR 122 to the west-southwest of Barney in Brooks County, Georgia at EF1 intensity. Tracking east-northeast, the tornado snapped or uprooted multiple trees and shifted a barn off of its foundation before it quickly intensified to low-end EF3 strength. A business in this area had two of its concrete exterior walls blown out. Debarking of trees occurred in this area as well. As the tornado passed just north of Barney, it abruptly turned northeast before entering Cook County.

Maintaining low-end EF3 intensity, the tornado passed just south of Adel and struck the Sunshine Acres mobile home park, causing tremendous damage. Of the park's roughly 100 homes, 45 were destroyed—35 of which were obliterated—with debris swept into piles along the south end of the development. Seven fatalities took place in Sunshine Acres. A survivor reported seeing a girl thrown into a ditch and a mother and son crushed underneath their home when it was thrown on top of them. A brick home had most of its second floor removed and two first floor exterior walls collapsed. Another home built of concrete blocks was destroyed, and a nearby farm had several concrete anchors for a large metal structure ripped from the ground. After entering Berrien County, low-end EF3 damage continued as another wood-framed home lost most of its second floor, trees sustained debarking, a well-strapped-down mobile home was tossed into nearby trees, and most of the roof to a brick home was removed. An add-on to the brick home was crushed by a very large tree, killing two occupants. The tornado eventually dissipated around 3:58 a.m.

Overall, the tornado killed 11 people along a  track lasting 29 minutes. Following the tornado, Georgia State Patrol troopers blocked off access to the community, eventually allowing residents to return on January 24.

Albany–Ashburn–Rochelle, Georgia

The most intense and longest lived tornado of the outbreak was a massive, rain-wrapped wedge tornado that began in southern Dougherty County, Georgia during the late afternoon hours of January 22. The tornado touched down at 3:15 p.m. EST (20:15 UTC) north of Newton. The first evidence of damage was at the intersection of Tarvis Road and Tarvis Lane, where the trunks of softwood trees were snapped (consistent with an EF1 tornado). From there, the tornado moved northeast at an average of 59 mph (95 km/h), causing EF2-level tree damage adjacent to Newton Road. Hundreds of large trees were snapped, twisted, and denuded in this area. Two homes sustained minor damage to their siding, gutters, and roofs. EF2 damage continued as the tornado entered Radium Springs, where several houses lost significant portions of their roofs and sustained damage to their porches. Many trees were snapped and uprooted, a poorly-constructed home on stilts was mostly collapsed, and a second house was shifted completely off its foundation and was severely damaged. The tornado then entered the eastern part of Albany, and a retail building along the Liberty Expressway had cinder block exterior walls blown out, and wooden power poles were snapped.

The tornado reached EF3 strength just past the Liberty Expressway as it impacted a one-story brick home, removing the roof and collapsing several exterior walls, snapping or uprooting almost all surrounding mature trees, and tossing a vehicle in the area. A few other homes in nearby neighborhoods also sustained significant structural damage. It then quickly weakened back to EF2 intensity as it completely destroyed the canopy of a service station, snapped large trees, tore the entire roof off of a restaurant, and severely damaged a large Procter & Gamble plant in Albany. Multiple anchored double-wide trailers were completely destroyed at the Marine Corp Logistics Base, and concrete light poles were snapped. Several semi-trailers were tossed and piled atop each other, and multiple other large metal industrial buildings sustained heavy damage in this area as well. A mobile home park community in this area was severely impacted, with multiple homes destroyed or twisted and rolled off their lots.

By 3:26 p.m. EST (20:26 UTC), the large and destructive tornado continued through the eastern outskirts of Albany, prompting a Tornado Emergency for Dougherty County. It re-attained EF3 as it caused significant damage to multiple structures. A well-constructed cement block church with hurricane straps and rebar reinforcement, as well as a well-constructed frame home, both had their exterior walls collapsed; damage at these locations was consistent with winds of approximately 150 mph (240 km/h), marking the tornado's peak strength. EF2 damage was inflicted to a small residence farther northeast, where large sections of the roof was ripped off. Near the intersection of North County Line Road and Harris Road, the wedge tornado once again regained EF3 intensity as it moved through several mobile home parks, destroying numerous manufactured houses; associated debris was tossed approximately 35 yd (32 m) downwind, and four fatalities were observed. A well-anchored triple-wide mobile home was completely swept away in this area, and a cinder block business was almost entirely flattened. A small church was leveled as well. In Worth County, north of Jewell Crowe Road, several homes sustained significant damage and many large trees were twisted and snapped. A large, well-built brick home sustained low-end EF3 damage in damage in this area as it had much of its roof ripped off and sustained some failure of exterior walls.

As the tornado continued northeast, it completely destroyed an outbuilding and continued to snap or uproot hundreds of hardwood trees. EF1 damage was inflicted to a double-wide mobile home that had its roof ripped off, and to another outbuilding that had its walls collapsed. Despite the tornado's abrupt weakening, it again intensified to EF3 intensity near the intersection of Zion Church Road and Blue Springs Road, where a concrete block church was leveled after its mortar failed between the blocks. After crossing into Turner County, the tornado passed near Ashburn. High-end EF2 damage was inflicted to residences that sustained roof and exterior wall loss, and evidence of a multiple-vortex structure was found. A large home on King Burgess Circle sustained EF3 damage, with two portions of the house completely collapsed and one portion completely slid off the foundation; this was the final instance of EF3 damage associated with the tornado. Mobile homes in this area were damaged or destroyed, and another frame home sustained EF2 roof damage. Tree damage became less prevalent and less severe thereafter in extreme southeastern Crisp County and northwestern Turner County.

Damage intensity varied from EF1 to EF2 in intensity as the tornado entered Wilcox County and passed near the town of Rochelle. Off Double Run Road and CR 41, a small farm building was completely destroyed. Two residences had their windows broken, and a metal building structure was severely damaged, with several anchored metal trusses ripped from the concrete foundation; this resulted in total collapse of the building. Additional metal barns and outbuildings nearby were severely damaged. Along Crawford Dairy Road, several large wooden electrical transmission towers were snapped. Farther northeast, a semi-truck trailer was flipped, flattened, and pushed across the road. Another metal building structure had its southeast corner completely destroyed, and it had a few 2 ft (0.61 m) deep concrete support beams ripped out of the ground. A small home sustained minor roof and siding damage, and several single to double-wide mobile homes were completely destroyed, with debris thrown up to 100 yd (91 m) downstream. Damage to some of the manufactured homes was consistent with a high-end EF2 tornado. The storm crossed Highway 280, destroying several small wooden sheds and fences, and downing numerous trees before finally lifting along Kingfisher Road west of Abbeville at 4:27 p.m. EST (21:27 UTC).

It killed five people—including an elderly woman who succumbed to head injuries days later—and injured over 40 others. A 2-year-old boy was separated from his mother during the tornado in Albany when a tree crashed into their home. Rescuers searched for the boy for nearly a week before calling it off with no signs of him. Later investigations were opened into the validity of this claim as the story began to develop weak points. It is possible the child was missing before the storms came through and foul play became a strong possibility. Twenty-four firefighters from central Georgia assisted with search-and-rescue efforts in Albany in the two days following the tornado. As of January 2022, the child remained missing.

Non-tornadic events

Windstorm (January 22)
In addition to the widespread damage from tornadoes, straight-line winds caused extensive damage in multiple states. One person was killed in Lake City, Florida, when a tree fell on their home. The Sunshine Skyway Bridge, crossing the mouth of Tampa Bay, was closed to all vehicles for several hours; at 5 p.m.; the Florida Highway Patrol stated that winds on the bridge averaged . At Orlando International Airport, wind gusts reached . Two tornadoes and powerful straight-line winds left more than 100,000 customers without electricity in the Miami Metropolitan Area.

Nor'easter (January 23–24)
After January 22, the extratropical cyclone continued to move to the northeast, striking the mid-Atlantic and New England states, and the southeastern portions of Canada while transitioning into a nor'easter, causing high winds, rain, snow, and ice storms. The storms caused wind damage to various buildings, including at least one death, and shuttered several airports and other transportation systems as it passed. It also caused significant beach erosion in parts of New Jersey and flooded coastal communities in New Jersey and Long Island. On the 24th, wind gusts around the New York City metro area approached . There was a lane closure on I-195 in Massachusetts. 

Freezing rain and snow caused treacherous traveling conditions across southern Quebec on January 24; at least 100 accidents were blamed on slippery roads.

Aftermath 
Following overnight tornadoes across Mississippi on January 21–22, Mississippi Governor Phil Bryant declared a state of emergency. Preliminary estimates for damage in Hattiesburg alone reached $200 million. The charity group Christian Services provided meals to 1,600 people in Hattiesburg on January 22. On January 25 President Donald Trump declared a major disaster for Mississippi, enabling the use of federal funding for victims in Forrest, Lamar, Lauderdale, and Perry counties.

President Trump offered his condolences and vowed to provide assistance to Georgia. Liaison officers from the Federal Emergency Management Agency were deployed to Alabama, Florida, Georgia, and Mississippi. The Red Cross began mobilizing relief efforts during the afternoon of January 22 in Georgia. Georgia Governor Nathan Deal declared a state of emergency in seven impacted counties and promised to provide the aid to affected areas. Georgia Lieutenant Governor Casey Cagle estimated damage across southwestern areas of the state at $400 million. President Trump declared a major disaster for Dougherty County on January 25, supplementing a prior declaration covering straight-line wind damage incurred on January 2 in Baker, Calhoun, Dougherty, Early, Mitchell, Turner, and Worth counties.

See also 

 1998 Kissimmee tornado outbreak
 2007 Groundhog Day tornado outbreak
 2013 Hattiesburg, Mississippi tornado
 Tornado outbreak of February 28 – March 2, 2007
 Tornado outbreak of January 21–23, 1999

Notes

References

External links 
Outbreak summaries from regional National Weather Service offices:

Atlanta, Georgia, WFO
Columbia, South Carolina, WFO
Jackson, Mississippi, WFO
Miami, Florida, WFO
Mobile, Alabama, WFO
Shreveport, Louisiana, WFO
Tallahassee, Florida, WFO

2016–17 North American winter
2017 in Alabama
2017 in Florida
2017 in Georgia (U.S. state)
2017 in Mississippi
January 2017 events in the United States
F3 tornadoes
Tornadoes of 2017
Tornadoes in Alabama
Tornadoes in Arkansas
Tornadoes in Florida
Tornadoes in Georgia (U.S. state)
Tornadoes in Louisiana
Tornadoes in Mississippi
Tornadoes in South Carolina
Tornadoes in Texas
2017 in Louisiana
2017 in Texas
2017 in Arkansas
2017 natural disasters in the United States
Natural disasters in Georgia (U.S. state)
Natural disasters in Quebec
Natural disasters in Louisiana
Natural disasters in Maine
Natural disasters in Alabama
2017 disasters in Canada